The following squads were selected for the 2018 Under-19 Cricket World Cup. Any players born on or after 1 September 1998 were eligible to be selected for the competition.

Group A

Kenya
Kenya's squad was announced on 15 December 2017:

New Zealand
New Zealand's squad was announced on 12 December 2017:

South Africa
South Africa's squad was announced on 11 December 2017:

West Indies
West Indies' squad was announced on 24 November 2017:

During the group stage fixtures, Raymond Perez was injured, ruled out of the tournament and replaced by Brad Barnes. Joshua Persaud left the squad midway through the tournament, following the death of his mother.

Group B

Australia
Australia's squad was announced on 15 December 2017:

 
During the tournament, Aaron Hardie replaced Jason Ralston in Australia's squad, who was injured. However, ahead of the final, Hardie suffered an injury and was replaced by Patrick Rowe.

India
India's squad was announced on 3 December 2017:

After the tournament started, Aditya Thakare was added to the squad as cover for Ishan Porel, who suffered an injury.

Papua New Guinea
Papua New Guinea's squad was announced on 28 December 2017:

Zimbabwe
Zimbabwe's squad was announced on 17 November 2017:

Group C

Bangladesh
Bangladesh's squad was announced on 6 December 2017:

Canada
Canada's squad was announced on 11 December 2017:

England
England's squad was announced on 11 December 2017:

Prior to the tournament, Tom Lammonby was ruled out of England's squad and was replaced by Euan Woods.

Namibia
Namibia's squad was announced on 21 November 2017:

Group D

Afghanistan
Afghanistan's squad was announced on 7 December 2017:

Ireland
Ireland's squad was announced on 8 December 2017:

Pakistan
Pakistan's squad was announced on 5 December 2017:

Sri Lanka
Sri Lanka's squad was announced on 11 December 2017:

During the group stage fixtures, Kalana Perera was injured, ruled out of the tournament and replaced by Thilan Prasan.

References

2018
Squads